The cuplé was a popular risqué Spanish theatre song style in the late years of the 19th century. From 1893–1911 the songs were a feature of the "género ínfimo" (lowest type) cabaret theatre sung by solo female singers, or men in drag, and attended mainly by men. But in the second decade of the 20th century the cuplé, in a more respectable form, became more family-friendly and was associated with the makings of stars of the Spanish theatre such as Aurora Jauffret, "La Goya". 

The term comes from French couplet, but the poetic form couplet in Spanish is a pareado or dístico. The cuplé prefigured the copla of the 1930s.

References

Spanish music
Cupletistas